Hannah Küchler (born 20 April 2002) is a German swimmer. She competed at the 2020 Summer Olympics, held July–August 2021 in Tokyo.

References

2002 births
Living people
German female swimmers
Olympic swimmers of Germany
Swimmers at the 2020 Summer Olympics
Sportspeople from Potsdam
Sportspeople from Hamburg